Marlborough is a village in St. Louis County, Missouri, United States. The population was 2,179 at the 2010 census.

Geography
Marlborough is located at  (38.567202, -90.339194).

Demographics

2010 census
As of the census of 2010, there were 2,179 people, 1,330 households, and 394 families living in the village. Marlborough is the most densely-populated community in the state of Missouri. The racial makeup of the village was 80.0% White, 8.2% African American, 0.4% Native American, 6.7% Asian, 2.1% from other races, and 2.6% from two or more races. Hispanic or Latino of any race were 5.6% of the population.

There were 1,330 households, of which 13.0% had children under the age of 18 living with them, 18.6% were married couples living together, 8.2% had a female householder with no husband present, 2.9% had a male householder with no wife present, and 70.4% were non-families. 57.7% of all households were made up of individuals, and 7.4% had someone living alone who was 65 years of age or older. The average household size was 1.64 and the average family size was 2.59.

The median age in the village was 31.6 years. 11.7% of residents were under the age of 18; 19.8% were between the ages of 18 and 24; 36.8% were from 25 to 44; 22.6% were from 45 to 64; and 9% were 65 years of age or older. The gender makeup of the village was 48.4% male and 51.6% female.

2000 census
As of the census of 2000, there were 2,235 people, 1,344 households, and 426 families living in the village. The racial makeup of the village was 79.60% White, 5.06% African American, 0.18% Native American, 11.59% Asian, 1.12% from other races, and 2.46% from two or more races. Hispanic or Latino of any race were 2.86% of the population.

There were 1,344 households, out of which 13.2% had children under the age of 18 living with them, 20.8% were married couples living together, 7.9% had a female householder with no husband present, and 68.3% were non-families. 58.3% of all households were made up of individuals, and 8.2% had someone living alone who was 65 years of age or older. The average household size was 1.66 and the average family size was 2.61.

In the village, the population was spread out, with 12.5% under the age of 18, 19.4% from 18 to 24, 39.3% from 25 to 44, 18.7% from 45 to 64, and 10.1% who were 65 years of age or older. The median age was 32 years. For every 100 females, there were 99.6 males. For every 100 females age 18 and over, there were 101.2 males.

The median income for a household in the village was $25,386, and the median income for a family was $40,331. Males had a median income of $27,155 versus $24,112 for females. The per capita income for the village was $18,442. About 11.4% of families and 15.4% of the population were below the poverty line, including 27.8% of those under age 18 and 1.6% of those age 65 or over.

References

Villages in St. Louis County, Missouri
Villages in Missouri